Prior to its uniform adoption of proportional representation in 1999, the United Kingdom used first-past-the-post for the European elections in England, Scotland and Wales. The European Parliament constituencies used under that system were smaller than the later regional constituencies and only had one Member of the European Parliament each. The constituency of Strathclyde West was one of them.

Boundaries 
1979-1984: Bute and North Ayrshire, Central Dunbartonshire, East Dunbartonshire, East Renfrewshire, Greenock and Port Glasgow, Paisley, West Dunbartonshire, West Renfrewshire.

1984-1999: Clydebank and Milngavie, Cunninghame North, Dumbarton, Eastwood, Greenock and Port Glasgow, Paisley North, Paisley South, Renfrew West and Inverclyde, Strathkelvin and Bearsden.

Members of the European Parliament

Results

References

External links
 David Boothroyd's United Kingdom Election Results

European Parliament constituencies in Scotland (1979–1999)
1979 establishments in Scotland
1999 disestablishments in Scotland
Constituencies established in 1979
Constituencies disestablished in 1999